The women's heptathlon competition at the 1998 Asian Games in Bangkok, Thailand was held on 13 and 14 December at the Thammasat Stadium.

Schedule
All times are Indochina Time (UTC+07:00)

Results

100 metres hurdles

High jump

Shot put

200 metres

Long jump

Javelin throw

800 metres

Summary

References

External links
Results

Women's heptathlon
1998